Saptha aeolodoxa is a moth in the family Choreutidae. It was described by Edward Meyrick in 1928. It is found on India's Andaman Islands.

References

Choreutidae
Moths described in 1928